Harris Saddle, also known as Harris Pass and officially known as Harris Saddle / Tarahaka Whakatipu is a mountain pass in Otago, on the South Island of New Zealand. It is located near Lake Harris and Conical Hill, and is part of the Routeburn Track.

In the early 1880s, William Walter Smith stated that he view from the pass was "magnificent" and he recommended it to be preserved as a scenic route.

References

Geography of Otago